The 12 Etudes d’exécution transcendante, Op.11, was a series of 12 etudes written from 1897 to 1905  by Sergei Lyapunov, and served as the posthumous continuation of Franz Liszt's uncompleted work Transcendental Études, having only the first 12 finished before his death in 1886. The work is also dedicated to Liszt, with the twelfth etude being named after the composer as well. Inspired by one of his three teachers during his time at Moscow Conservatory Karl Klindworth, a former student of Liszt, along with being heavily influenced and artistically guided by Mily Balakirev, the main ideologue of The Five, these Etudes use the full gamut of Nationalist techniques: From folk-songs and church bells, to Caucasian melodies and sumptuous melodicism.

Etudes 

 "Berceuse" ("Lullaby") in F♯ major
 "Ronde des Fantômes" ("The ghosts' dance") in D♯ minor
 "Carillon" ("The bells") in B major
 "Térek" ("The river Terek") in G♯ minor
 "Nuit d'été" ("Summer night") in E major
 "Tempête" ("The storm") in C♯ minor
 "Idylle" in A major
 "Chant épique" ("Epic song") in F♯ minor
 "Harpes éoliennes" ("The Aeolian harps") in D major
 "Lesghinka" in B minor
 "Ronde des sylphes" ("Dance of the sylphs") in G major
 "Élégie en mémoire de François Liszt" ("Elegy in memory of Liszt") in E minor

Recordings 

 Lyapunov, S.M.: 12 Études d'exécution transcendante, Op. 11 (Scherbakov, K.) (Naxos, 1993)

See also 

 Sergei Mikhailovich Lyapunov

Sources 

 Onegina Olga Vladimirovna. Piano music by S.M. Lyapunov. Style features: dissertation ... of a candidate of art history: 17.00.02 / Olga Vladimirovna Onegina; [Place of protection: St. Petersburg. state conservatory im. ON THE. Rimsky-Korsakov] .- St. Petersburg, 2010.- 292 p .: ill. RSL OD, 61 10-17 / 114

References 

Russian composers
Russian music